Michael "Jersey Mike" Rossi (born February 25, 1994) is an American freestyle aerialist from the Long Valley section of Washington Township, Morris County, New Jersey. He has been competing in the FIS Freestyle Skiing World Cup since the 2011–2012 season. In the 2012–2013 season, he earned a bronze medal at the Deer Valley World Cup competition.

References

External links 
 
 Mike Rossi's Official Website

1994 births
American male freestyle skiers
Living people
People from Washington Township, Morris County, New Jersey
Sportspeople from Morris County, New Jersey